Janet Hamill (born July 29, 1945 in Jersey City, New Jersey) is an American poet and spoken word artist. Her poem "K-E-R-O-U-A-C" was nominated for a Pushcart Prize, and her fifth collection, titled Body of Water, was nominated for the William Carlos Williams Award by the Poetry Society of America. Her first collection of short fiction,  titled Tales from the Eternal Cafe (Three Rooms Press, 2014), was named one of the "Best Books of 2014" by Publishers Weekly.

Life
Born in Christ Hospital in Jersey City, Hamill spent her first five years in Weehawken, New Jersey, then moved to suburban New Milford, New Jersey in 1950. In 1963, she attended Glassboro State College (now Rowan University) in south Jersey, where she earned a BA in English in 1967. It was at Glassboro that Hamill met lifelong friend and collaborator, musician and poet Patti Smith. Both considered campus outcasts and beatniks bonded over art and rock n’roll on the staff of the Avant, the campus literary magazine, and back stage at the campus theatre where they were both active. After graduation, Hamill and Smith made their way to New York, where they found their first apartments near the Pratt Institute in Brooklyn. Smith moved in with photographer Robert Mapplethorpe, and Hamill lived a few blocks away on Clinton Ave. In 1968, Hamill moved to the lower east side, where she briefly shared an apartment with Smith. For the next 25 years, lower Manhattan was Hamill's home. With New York City as her base, she worked in bookstores and traveled across the U.S. and into Mexico. She took a freighter across the Atlantic and traveled through southern Europe, Morocco, Egypt, Sudan, Ethiopia, Kenya, and Tanzania. Upon her return in 1975, Hamill published Troublante, her first book, and became an active member of the downtown literary community. She read frequently at venues such as the Poetry Project at St. Mark's Church in-the-Bowery, wrote, directed and acted in Bob Holman’s Poet's Theatre and performed with new wave musician Adele Bertei (The Contortions) at the Mudd Club.

A strong proponent of the spoken word, Hamill has read widely in New York City, across the country and in Europe at museums, venues and festivals such as St. Marks Church, The People's Poetry Gathering, The Walt Whitman Cultural Center, the WORD Festival, the Bowery Poetry Club, the Knitting Factory, CBGB’s Gallery, the Nuyorican Café, Central Park Summer Stage, Lowell Celebrates Kerouac, the Andy Warhol Museum, The Rubin Museum, Cathedral of St. John the Divine, Seattle's Bumbershoot Festival, the Liss Ard Festival in County Cork, Ireland, Patti Smith's Meltdown Festival in London, the Latitude Festival in Southwold, England, and Liverpool's Heartbeats series.

She has released two CDs of spoken word and music in collaboration with the band Lost Ceilings. Flying Nowhere (Yes No Maybe Records, 2000) was produced by Lenny Kaye and executive-produced by Bob Holman; the CD featured cameo performances by Lenny Kaye and Patti Smith. Genie of the Alphabet (Not Records 2005), produced by Janet Hamill and Bob Torsello, featured cameos by Lenny Kaye, Patti Smith, Bob Holman and beat legend David Amram.

In 2018, contemporary Irish composer Ian Wilson adapted Janet's poem "A Thousand Years" to music. The piece, titled "How Goes the Night," after a line from "A Thousand Years," was commissioned by the Glass Farm Ensemble. It had its New York debut at Symphony space on November 17, 2019.

Hamill resides in New York's lower Hudson Valley. She's a professional tutor for the English Department at SUNY Orange and a member the advisory board of the Seligmann Center in Sugar Loaf, New York, an organization located on the estate of Surrealist painter Kurt Seligmann. Hamill is the founder and director of MEGAPHONE, the center's literary program. She received her MFA in Creative Writing/Poetry from New England College in June 2014. She had taught creative writing workshops at The Poetry Project for Naropa University, New England College, and Seligmann Center. She also has presented workshops in Liverpool and London.

Works

Poetry
Troublante, Oliphant Press (1975)
The Temple, Telephone Books (1980)
Nostalgia of the Infinite, Ocean View Books (1992)
Lost Ceilings, Telephone Books, (1999)
Body of Water, Bowery Books (2008)
Knock, Spuyten Duyvil (2016)
Real Fire, Alexandria Quarterly Press (2017)
A Map of the Heavens:  Selected Poems 1975-2017 Spuyten Duyvil (2020)

Fiction
Tales from the Eternal Cafe, Three Rooms Press, (2014)

CDs
Flying Nowhere (NOT Records), 2000
Genie of the Alphabet (NOT Records), 2005

Grants/Awards
One Voice Work Grant, 2001–2011
Ramapo-Catskill Library Program of the Year, 1999
Joel Oppenheimer Scholarship, New England College

References

External links 
 Official Janet Hamill Website
 Janet Hamill YouTube site
 Janet Hamill's poem Requiem
 Patti Smith's forward to Janet Hamill's book Nostalgia of the Infinite
 Janet Hamill's Three Rules for Performance Poems 
Guide to Janet Hamill Archive, Division of Rare and Manuscript Collections Cornell University   Library
Penn Sound, Janet Hamill
Real Fire: A Suite of Photographs and Poems by Richard Baron and Janet Hamill
“Building a Boat Inside Myself” interview for Great Weather for Media
Chronogram – Janet Hamill Raises a Toast to La Vie Boheme
“Orpheus and Eurydice: The Way to the Underworld”
“The Lonesome Death of Hart Crane” 
“Autumn Melancholy,” BOMB magazine
“Knock,” Alexandra Quarterly
"THE HOLINESS OF THE ALPHABET: AN INTERVIEW WITH JANET HAMILL" Rain Taxi 
Janet Hamill Archies - The Poetry Project
Janet Hamill 2 by BlaineGreenwood 
Janet Hamill – Synesthesia Writing Prompt - Mom Egg Review
Patti Smith with Lenny Kaye and Janet Hamill | in New York - Time Out
Spyuten Duyvil 
Alexandria Quarterly Press

American women poets
American spoken word artists
Living people
1945 births
Rowan University alumni
Writers from Jersey City, New Jersey
People from New Milford, New Jersey
People from Weehawken, New Jersey
Educators from New Jersey
21st-century American women